Andrew Ram may refer to:

 Andrew Ram (died 1698), MP for Duleek (Parliament of Ireland constituency)
 Andrew Ram (1711–1793), MP for Duleek and Wexford County (Parliament of Ireland constituency)